Eric Prescott (born 21 June 1948) is an English former rugby union, and professional rugby league footballer who played in the 1960s, 1970s and 1980s.

Background
Eric Prescott was born in Widnes, Lancashire, England.

Playing career

County honours
Eric Prescott represented Lancashire (RL).

Championship appearances
Eric Prescott played in Salford's victories in the Championship in the 1973–74 season, and the 1975–76 season.

Championship/Premiership Final appearances
Eric Prescott played , i.e. number 5, and scored 2-tries in St. Helens' 24-12 victory over Leeds in the Championship play-off Final during the 1969–70 season at Odsal Stadium, Bradford on Saturday 16 May 1970, and played  in Salford's 2-15 defeat by St. Helens in the Premiership Final during the 1975–76 season at Station Road, Swinton on Saturday 22 May 1976.

Challenge Cup Final appearances
Eric Prescott played right-, i.e. number 12, in Widnes' 18-9 victory over Hull Kingston Rovers in the 1981 Challenge Cup Final during the 1980–81 season at Wembley Stadium, London on Saturday 2 May 1981, and played right- in the 14-14 draw with Hull F.C. in the 1982 Challenge Cup Final during the 1981–82 season at Wembley Stadium, London on Saturday 1 May 1982, in front of a crowd of 92,147, played right- in the 9-18 defeat by Hull F.C. in the 1982 Challenge Cup Final replay during the 1981–82 season at Elland Road, Leeds on Wednesday 19 May 1982, in front of a crowd of 41,171,

County Cup Final appearances
Eric Prescott played as an interchange/substitute (replacing  Graham Rees) in St. Helens' 4-7 defeat by Leigh in the 1970 Lancashire County Cup Final during the 1970–71 season at Station Road, Swinton on Saturday 28 November 1970, played  in Salford's 25-11 victory over Swinton in the 1972 Lancashire County Cup Final during the 1972–73 season at Wilderspool Stadium, Warrington on Saturday 21 October 1972, played  in the 9-19 defeat by Wigan in the 1973 Lancashire County Cup Final during the 1973–74 season at Wilderspool Stadium, Warrington on Saturday 13 October 1973, played  in the 2-6 defeat by Widnes in the 1974 Lancashire County Cup Final during the 1974–75 season at Central Park, Wigan on Saturday 2 November 1974, played  in the 7-16 defeat by Widnes in the 1975 Lancashire County Cup Final during the 1975–76 season at Central Park, Wigan on Saturday 4 October 1975, played right-, i.e. number 12, in Widnes' 3-8 defeat by Leigh in the 1981 Lancashire County Cup Final during the 1981–82 season at Central Park, Wigan on Saturday 26 September 1981, and played right-, i.e. number 12, in the 8-12 defeat by Barrow in the 1983 Lancashire County Cup Final during the 1983–84 season at Central Park, Wigan on Saturday 1 October 1983.

BBC2 Floodlit Trophy Final appearances
Eric Prescott was an interchange/substitute, i.e. number 14, in St. Helens' 4-7 defeat by Wigan in the 1968 BBC2 Floodlit Trophy Final during the 1968–69 season at Central Park, Wigan on Tuesday 17 December 1968, played right-, i.e. number 12, in the 5-9 defeat by Leeds in the 1970 BBC2 Floodlit Trophy Final during the 1970-71 season at Headingley Rugby Stadium, Leeds on Tuesday 15 December 1970, played left-, i.e. number 11, in the 8-2 victory over Rochdale Hornets in the 1971 BBC2 Floodlit Trophy Final during the 1971-72 season at Headingley Rugby Stadium, Leeds on Tuesday 14 December 1971, played  in Salford's 0-0 draw with Warrington in the 1974 BBC2 Floodlit Trophy Final during the 1974–75 season at The Willows, Salford on Tuesday 17 December 1974, and played  in the 10-5 victory over Warrington in the 1974 BBC2 Floodlit Trophy Final replay during the 1974–75 season at Wilderspool Stadium, Warrington on Tuesday 28 January 1975.

Club career
Eric Prescott was transferred from St. Helens to Salford for a world record fee of £13,500 on 6 September 1972, he was transferred from Salford to Widnes for a fee of £22,000 in 1980, and he was transferred from Widnes to Salford in exchange for John Wood in January 1984.

Genealogical Information
Prescott is the father of the late rugby league footballer, Steve Prescott.

References

External links
Profile at saints.org.uk
Statistics at rugby.widnes.tv

1948 births
Living people
English rugby league players
Lancashire rugby league team players
Liverpool City (rugby league) players
Rugby league centres
Rugby league locks
Rugby league players from Widnes
Rugby league second-rows
Rugby league wingers
Salford Red Devils players
St Helens R.F.C. players
Widnes Vikings players